Anthony Joseph Henderson (born 14 January 1954 in Newcastle upon Tyne, England) is a former association footballer who captained Australia five times in the early 1980s.

Playing career

Club career
Henderson played youth football at Blackpool before signing for Rotherham United where he made six league appearances between 1970 and 1974.

In 1975 moved to South Africa where he turned out for Durban United before moving during the 1975 season to East London. He played at East London until the end of the 1976 season.

In 1977, he joined Canberra City for the first year of the Australian National Soccer League. In two seasons with City he played 51 matches, scoring five goals.

Before the 1979 NSL season Henderson transferred to Marconi Stallions. In ten seasons with the West Sydney team he played 243 matches, scoring 16 goals.

International career
Henderson played 27 full international matches for Australia between 1979 and 1983, including five matches as captain. He also played 23 B-Internationals for Australia.

References

1954 births
Australian soccer players
Australia international soccer players
Australia B international soccer players
Living people
Bonnyrigg White Eagles FC players
Association football defenders